Nymphes is a lacewing genus in the family Nymphidae.

Species 
 Nymphes aperta
 Nymphes modesta
 Nymphes myrmeleonides
 Nymphes nigrescens
 Nymphes paramyrmeleonides
 †Nymphes georgei

References

External links 

Nymphidae
Neuroptera genera